2-Chloroethanesulfonyl chloride is a chemical compound used in the making of other chemicals. It is a severe skin and eye irritant, and can also cause irritation to the nose, throat and lungs when inhaled.

References

Sulfonyl halides